Otis E. Finley Sr. (1898 – August 27, 1979) was an American football coach. He served as the head football coach Lincoln University in Jefferson City, Missouri in 1924 and at Virginia State College for Negroes—now known as Virginia State University–from 1925 to 1926, compiling a career college football coaching record of 9–6–5. Finley was born in 1898, in LaFayette, Alabama. He was a graduate of Tuskegee University, the University of Akron, and Springfield College in Springfield, Massachusetts. He died on August 27, 1979, in Maryland.

Head coaching record

College

References

1898 births
1979 deaths
Lincoln Blue Tigers football coaches
Springfield Pride football players
Virginia State Trojans football coaches
High school football coaches in Missouri
Tuskegee University alumni
University of Akron alumni
People from LaFayette, Alabama
Coaches of American football from Alabama
Players of American football from Alabama
African-American coaches of American football
African-American players of American football
20th-century African-American sportspeople